The UCI Women's World Tour is the premier annual female elite road cycling tour.

History

In order to increase the coverage of Women's cycling the UCI held a summit in December 2014 between the UCI Women's Working Group and the UCI Women's teams. The previous racing series, the UCI Women's Road World Cup, limited racing to 10 one-day events, whilst the Women's World Tour has a threefold increase in the total number of racing days.

In order to facilitate this a proposal was forwarded to split the single tiered UCI Women's team classification, into a two tiered system beginning in 2017. The premier division would consist of 10 teams who, like their male counterparts, will be required to compete in all World Tour events. The second tier will be similar to domestic men's teams (UCI Continental Teams). Initially the rankings will be based on the teams UCI rankings.

One requirement of the series is that all rounds are to be broadcast on live TV or via streaming, with race organisers creating media pages for each event in English and/or French.

For one-day races teams must consist of up to six riders, with no fewer than four and for stage races, seven or eight with no fewer than five. Minimum prize money will also be included; €5130 for one day races or time trials and €2565 per day for a stage race.

Events
In comparison to the one-day race only World Cup, the Women's WorldTour will include stage races as well as one-day races, increasing the total number of race days to between 30 and 35. Events will also see an increase in the maximum distance which can be covered: from 130 to 140 kilometres for a one-day race and average stage race stage distance increasing from 100 to 120 kilometres. Race organisers are allowed to apply for special dispensation to have longer stages.

For events to be considered they must have reached the following criteria:
 UCI Class 1 Road status
 Dates of candidate events must not clash with existing Women's World Cup and Class 1 events
 Dates and locations of candidate events must fit with the narrative of the season, whilst also providing some logic for the travel of teams

Winners by race

2016–2021

2022-

Victories
Updated: 2022 season

Riders in italics are no longer active.

Teams in italics are no longer active.

Season results

Individual ranking

Youth ranking

Team ranking

Participating teams

Key

References

 
Recurring sporting events established in 2016
Women World Tour
Women's road cycling